Heinrich von Hohenlohe (died 15 July 1249) was the seventh Grand Master of the Teutonic Order, serving between 1244 and 1249. He was the son of one of the richest and most powerful feudal lords in Württemberg and had four brothers and one sister.

Von Hohenlohe was canon of the Bishopric of Würzburg from 1218 to 1219. In 1220, he and two of his brothers joined the Teutonic Order, donating at the same time his part of his father's inheritance to the Order. It turned out to be one of the most powerful komturships in German lands, Mergentheim on the river Tauber. In 1221, von Hohenlohe went on a pilgrimage to the Holy Land and, upon returning, became the Komtur of Mergentheim.

Upon the orders of Grand Master Hermann von Salza in 1225, von Hohenlohe escorted Isabella II of Jerusalem, the second wife of Emperor Frederick II, to the Kingdom of Italy.  From that point, von Hohenlohe would spend much time around the Grand Master, holding important positions in Germany, and residing in Mergentheim.

When the Order's chapter removed Gerhard von Malberg from the office of Grand Master, von Hohenlohe was chosen as his successor. He was considered to support the emperor and, in the conflict between Frederick II and Pope Innocent IV, von Hohenlohe represented the interests of the emperor, causing an uproar between many of the Order's brothers led by the Master of the Livonian Order, Dietrich von Grüningen.

In 1246, von Hohenlohe rushed to Prussia to start a crusade and as a result, he captured Christburg. He signed a favorable treaty with the Old Prussians and the Duke of Pomerania, Świętopełk II the Great.

Von Hohenlohe died in July 1249, shortly after returning from Prussia. He was buried in the church in Mergentheim. 

1249 deaths
German untitled nobility
Grand Masters of the Teutonic Order
Heinrich von Hohenlohe
Year of birth unknown